Film1 Drama is a Dutch premium television channel owned by SPI International. Every night the programming is dedicated to a theme, such as a director or a genre. Film1 launched together with its sister service Sport1 on 1 February 2006 and replaced the Canal+ Netherlands television channels. Film1 offers multiple channels with Dutch and international film and television series productions. Initially Film1 Drama started as Film1 Series on 17 January 2012 when it replaced the 1 hour timeshift channel Film1 Premiere +1, focusing on television series. It changed into Film1 Spotlight on 6 September 2013. On 1 September 2016 Film1 Spotlight got renamed by Film1 Drama.

The channel is available on most digital cable and IPTV providers, and Satellite provider CanalDigitaal. DVB-T provider Digitenne doesn't provide Film1 Drama.

See also
 Film1
 Television in the Netherlands
 Digital television in the Netherlands

External links
 film1.nl 
 alleenopeen.tv

References

Television channels in the Netherlands
SPI International
Television channels and stations established in 2012